Machinegum is an American indie rock supergroup based in New York City. The band is composed of Fabrizio Moretti (drummer of The Strokes), Ian Devaney (vocalist of Nation of Language), Steve Marion, Chris Egan, Martin Bonventre, and Erin Victoria Axtel. Formed in 2018, the band formed by performing and presenting art gallery installation, and collaborating with musicians and architects. The band released their debut studio album, Conduit in late 2019 through Frenchkiss Records.

History 
Formed in 2018, the band which both performs and records music and presents gallery installations. The group has also collaborated with architect Joseph Vescio and actor/director Justin Bartha in the past.

The band members are known for being in several other New York-based bands. Moretti is best known as being the drummer of The Strokes. Devaney is best known as being the lead vocalist for Nation of Language. Marion is known for his stage name and associated music project, Delicate Steve. Egan, Bonventre, and Axtel all have independent self-titled projects in the New York metropolitan area.

Machinegum released their debut album Conduit on December 8, 2019. through Frenchkiss Records. Upon the release, the group later signed to the record label in February 2020, where the album was subsequently re-released on vinyl on July 17, 2020. The album was met with positive critic reviews.

Discography 
 Conduit (2019)

References

External links 
 Official Website

Musical groups established in 2018
Indie rock musical groups from New York (state)
2018 establishments in New York City
Sextets